Max Capote is a singer-songwriter from Montevideo, Uruguay. He was nominated Latin Grammy Awards of 2011 for Best New Artist.
In 2013, Billboard selected him as one of "Ten Latin Artists to Watch in 2013".

Biography

Discography 
 Grandes Éxitos (2005)
 Chicle (2008)
 Simple en vinilo de 7" Ana – Si Nena (2011)
 Aperitivo de moda (2014)

References

External links 
 Max Capote Official Website

Singers from Montevideo
21st-century Uruguayan male singers
Uruguayan pop singers
Uruguayan singer-songwriters
Uruguayan composers
Male composers
Rock en Español musicians
Living people
Year of birth missing (living people)